is a Japanese politician of the Democratic Party of Japan, a member of the House of Councillors in the Diet (national legislature). A native of Okazaki, Aichi, he graduated from the University of Tokyo and received master's degrees from it and Columbia University, he was elected to the House of Councillors for the first time in 1998 after running unsuccessfully for the prefectural assembly of Tokyo.

In November 2017 an investigation conducted by the International Consortium of Investigative Journalism cited his name in the list of politicians named in "Paradise Papers" allegations.

References

External links 
 Official website in Japanese.

Members of the House of Councillors (Japan)
University of Tokyo alumni
Columbia University alumni
Living people
1964 births
People from Okazaki, Aichi
Democratic Party of Japan politicians
People named in the Paradise Papers